Brigadier Duncan MacIntyre  (10 November 19158 June 2001) was a New Zealand politician of the National Party. He served as the eighth deputy prime minister of New Zealand from 1981 to 1984 under Prime Minister Robert Muldoon.

Biography

Early life and career
MacIntyre was born at Hastings on 10 November 1915. He was the eldest of six children between Esther Mary Bell and the Scottish-born Archibald MacIntyre, a farmer near Bridge Pā. He attended school in Hastings before being sent by his father to Scotland where he attended Larchfield School. He returned to New Zealand where he received his secondary school education at Christ's College, Christchurch.

He started work in 1933 as a farm cadet and from 1936 managed a farm at Punakitere, Northland until 1939. MacIntyre married Diana Grace Hunter, the daughter of a Hawke's Bay farming family on 10 January 1939 in Havelock North. The two were to have three daughters and two sons. In 1939, at the outbreak of the World War II, he left farming and joined the New Zealand Army.

Military career
MacIntyre enlisted in the 15th (North Auckland) Regiment. He was to serve with the Divisional Cavalry Regiment (or "Div Cav") in North Africa and Italy. He had risen to the rank of major by December 1944 and was appointed commander of C Squadron of the div cav (D Squadron was later led by Jack Marshall, a future parliamentary colleague and prime minister). He led the div cav offensive in April 1945 which helped to spearhead the final New Zealand Division offensive in Italy. The attack swept northwards against German resistance which had mostly collapsed. For his leadership in the offensive he was made a Companion of the Distinguished Service Order. In particular he was noted for leading a 'vigorous counter-attack' on the night of 17/18 April across the Gaiana River before climbing onto a knocked-out Sherman tank and used its machine gun to pin down enemy positions the following day. He was later promoted to lieutenant colonel and on 7 August 1945 MacIntyre took command of the whole div cav, still stationed in Italy.

Upon the formation of J Force (New Zealand's portion of the British Commonwealth Occupation Force in Japan) he volunteered to lead the Cavalry component, which was also to include 270 troops from the 28th Māori Battalion. He arrived in Japan in March 1946, but by late April was in hospital with appendicitis. He briefly returned to duty but was to relinquish command on 28 June.

MacIntyre returned to New Zealand and resumed farming and joined the local branch of Federated Farmers. He purchased a sheep farm near Pōrangahau in southern Hawke's Bay in the early 1950s and was elected to the Hawke's Bay Catchment Board. His military career continued on part-time with the Territorial Force, commanding various components including the Hawke's Bay Regiment, Armoured Car Regiment, Infantry Brigade and Armoured Brigade as well as gaining the rank of brigadier.

In the 1956 New Year Honours, MacIntyre was appointed an Officer of the Order of the British Empire (Military Division).

Political career

With Robert Muldoon and Peter Gordon he was one of the three "Young Turks" of the National Party who entered Parliament in 1960. The trio would regularly discuss the issues of the day over late-night drinks and their wives also were to become friends. They became noted for their willingness to challenge senior National ministers as well as members of the Labour opposition on issues. In 1961 he was one of ten National MPs to vote with the Opposition and remove capital punishment for murder from the Crimes Bill that the Second National Government had introduced.

He served under three Prime Ministers (Keith Holyoake, Jack Marshall, and later Robert Muldoon) as Cabinet Minister. He was Minister of Lands and Minister of Forests from 1966 to 1972, Minister of Māori Affairs, Minister of Island Territories from 1969 to 1972 and Minister of Island Affairs and Minister for the Environment in 1972. He gained a reputation as capable and hardworking and was a strong advocate for diversifying forest planting as well as its applications on private land, seeing its potential to boost the incomes of farmers as well as providing employment and supporting the processing industry. In 1971 and 1972 MacIntyre was Administrator of Tokelau.

He promoted the Māori Affairs Amendment Act 1967, which threatened to increase the alienation of Māori land, but MacIntyre foresaw that there would be economic opportunities for Māori in both the forestry and fisheries industries. He would emphasise 'self-help' to Māori and urged iwi and hapū to develop their lands productively to avoid the risk of losing them.

As Minister for the Environment he became unpopular during the Save Manapouri campaign and, just weeks out from an election, gazetted trout farming legislation which displeased anglers and conservationists. At a public meeting in Hastings during the election campaign the prime minister, Jack Marshall, told those in attendance "If anglers want the trout farm legislation repealed, then I suggest they vote for Mr. Kirk [Labour Party leader Norman Kirk]." Out of parliament he returned to farming, before being appointed by the Meat Producers' Board as chairman of their export committee.

Under Muldoon he was appointed again to the cabinet. He was Minister of Māori Affairs (1975–1978), Minister of Agriculture and Fisheries (1975–1977), Minister of Agriculture (1977–1984), and Minister of Fisheries (1978–1984). He was made a Privy Councillor in 1980.

In September 1980 MacIntyre gave a Marginal Land Boards loan to his daughter and son-in-law raising questions around Conflict of interest. In 1979 his daughter Audrey and her husband, Jim Fitzgerald, had purchased land near Karori, Wellington. After applying twice unsuccessfully, they were granted a loan of $137,000 from the Marginal Lands Board to develop the property. A public inquiry later concluded that MacIntyre had not acted willfully improperly. Nonetheless, several public resignations of National Party officeholders followed in MacIntyre's East Cape electorate causing serious damage to MacIntyre's reputation. He later conceded that the 'Marginal Lands affair' was "a ghost that haunts me for the rest of my life."

Later life

In the 1992 Queen's Birthday Honours, MacIntyre was appointed a Companion of the Order of St Michael and St George, for public services.

He died at Waipukurau on 8 June 2001. Ngāti Kahungunu held him in such high regard for his conduct as Māori Affairs Minister that his body was at their Porangahau Marae for one night before the funeral. He was survived by his second wife Jaqueline MacIntyre (Gilbertson), daughters and a son.

Notes

References

External links

 Rt. Hon. Duncan MacIntyre, MP (record group) (AEFU), Archives New Zealand

1915 births
2001 deaths
New Zealand military personnel
Administrators of Tokelau
Members of the Cabinet of New Zealand
Members of the New Zealand House of Representatives
New Zealand farmers
New Zealand National Party MPs
New Zealand MPs for North Island electorates
New Zealand military personnel of World War II
New Zealand brigadiers
New Zealand Companions of the Order of St Michael and St George
New Zealand Companions of the Distinguished Service Order
New Zealand Officers of the Order of the British Empire
People educated at Christ's College, Christchurch
Deputy Prime Ministers of New Zealand
Unsuccessful candidates in the 1984 New Zealand general election
Unsuccessful candidates in the 1972 New Zealand general election
People from Hastings, New Zealand
New Zealand members of the Privy Council of the United Kingdom